Bartschia is a genus of sea snails, marine gastropod mollusks in the family Colubrariidae.

Species
Species within the genus Bartschia include:
 Bartschia agassizi Clench & Aguayo, 1941
 Bartschia frumari Garcia, 2008
 Bartschia guppyi (Olsson & Bayer, 1972)
 Bartschia peartae Harasewych, 2014
 Bartschia significans Rehder, 1943
Species brought into synonymy
 Bartschia canetae Clench & Aguayo, 1944: synonym of Eosipho canetae (Clench & Aguayo, 1944) 
 Bartschia fusiformis (Clench & Aguayo, 1941): synonym of Manaria fusiformis (Clench & Aguayo, 1941)
 Bartschia taiwanensis K. Y. Lai & B. S. Jung, 2012: synonym of Belomitra brachytoma (Schepman, 1913)

References

External links
 Rehder H.A. (1943). New marine mollusks from the Antillean Region. Proceedings of the United States National Museum. 93(3161): 187-203, pls 19-20
 García E.F. (2008). Four new buccinid species (Gastropoda: Buccinidae) from the western Atlantic. Novapex. 9(4): 141-148

Colubrariidae